This is a list of singles which topped the Irish Singles Chart in 1962.

Until 1992 the Irish singles chart was compiled from trade shipments from the labels to record stores, rather than from consumer sales.

See also
1962 in music
Irish Singles Chart
List of artists who reached number one in Ireland

1962 in Irish music
1962 record charts
1962